1975: The Duets is a 1975 studio album by Dave Brubeck and Paul Desmond. It was the only album the pair made that solely featured them as a duo.

Reception

The album was reviewed by Ken Dryden at Allmusic who wrote that "Their magical ESP is evident from start to finish. Brubeck's lyricism throughout these sessions will surprise critics who label him as "bombastic," while Desmond, known for his pure dry-toned alto sax, throws a few curves to his longtime fans....the memorable interaction between the two musicians during this performance should be considered one of the high points of their respective careers. This is an essential acquisition for fans of Dave Brubeck and Paul Desmond." 
This album's notes recite that Brubeck and Desmond earned a transatlantic crossing playing these numbers on the ship nightly, later recording this  set which likely represents eight basically then ad hoc arrangements.   The album has been out-of-print for years.

Track listing 
 "Alice in Wonderland" (Sammy Fain, Bob Hilliard) - 4:04
 "These Foolish Things (Remind Me of You)" (Harry Link, Holt Marvell, Jack Strachey) - 5:09
 "La Paloma Azul (Blue Dove)" (Traditional) - 4:34
 "Stardust" (Hoagy Carmichael, Mitchell Parish) - 4:45
 "Koto Song" (Dave Brubeck) - 5:56
 "Balcony Rock" (Brubeck, Paul Desmond) - 2:16
 "Summer Song" (Brubeck) - 3:18
 "You Go to My Head" (J. Fred Coots, Haven Gillespie) - 7:32

Personnel 
 Dave Brubeck - piano, arranger
 Paul Desmond - alto saxophone, liner notes

Production
 Hollis King, Roland Young - art direction
 Dave Achelis - assistant engineer
 Harry Mittman - photography
 Stan Evenson, Isabelle Wong - design
 Elvin Campbell - engineer
 Kevin Reeves - mastering
 John Snyder - producer
 Andy Kman - production coordination
 Harry Weinger - reissue supervisor

References

External links
 1975: The Duets at YouTube

1975 albums
Dave Brubeck albums
Paul Desmond albums
Horizon Records albums
Instrumental duet albums